Lawrence Joseph "Larry" DeNardis (March 18, 1938 – August 24, 2018) was an American politician who served as a U.S. Congressman for the state of Connecticut. He was also president of the University of New Haven.

Early life and career
DeNardis was born in New Haven, Connecticut, on March 18, 1938; graduated from Hamden High School, Hamden, Connecticut, in 1956 and received a B.A. from Holy Cross College in 1960, an M.A. and a Ph.D. from New York University, in 1964 and 1989, respectively. He served in the United States Naval Reserve, 1960–1963 and was associate professor at Albertus Magnus College.

Political career

DeNardis was active in Republican Party politics in the 1960s, serving as a delegate to the state Republican conventions beginning in 1966. In 1970, he became a member of the Connecticut State Senate. He served in the Senate until 1979, when he resigned to become President of the Connecticut Conference of Independent Colleges.

In 1980, he ran for the United States House of Representatives from 3rd congressional district that Democrat Rep. Robert Giaimo had held for 22 years before retiring. Although the Democratic Party had a significant advantage in voter registration, the district supported Ronald Reagan by 25,769 votes in the presidential election and DeNardis defeated then-State Senator Joe Lieberman by 13,121 votes.

In the Ninety-seventh United States Congress, he was a leader of the “gypsy moths”, a grouping of moderate Republicans that opposed some of Reagan’s budget cuts. He ultimately supported some of the cuts, but retained a $16 million grant to renovate the train station in New Haven.

In 1982, he faced Democrat Bruce Morrison, the Executive Director of the New Haven Legal Assistance Association. Morrison was a former classmate of Bill Clinton at Yale Law School. Although Denardis touted his opposition to some of Reagan’s initiatives, the district had a 110,000 –55,000 registration advantage and Morrison prevailed in the election by 1,687 votes.

In 1984, DeNardis sought to win back his seat in a strong Republican year. Despite Reagan’s margin of more than 20% in Connecticut and the Republican capture of both houses of the Connecticut General Assembly, he again lost to Morrison.

After Congress
After losing the 1984 election, DeNardis was given a political appointment in the Reagan Administration, serving as assistant secretary in the U.S. Department of Health and Human Services from 1985 to 1987.

He joined the University of New Haven as President, serving in that position from 1991 to 2004 before becoming President Emeritus. He succeeded Phillip S. Kaplan. He led a great expansion of programs and facilities during his tenure as the University's President, including substantial international programs, and participated in international election monitoring missions. After retiring as university president, he continued to serve as a member of the faculty, teaching national security policy. He also was chairman of the Institute for New Democracies, a nongovernmental organization that advises evolving democracies. He was an independent election observer in central Asian countries, and in December 2009 was an advisor to the Democratic League of Kosovo (LDK) as it participated in local elections in Kosovo.

He briefly ran for Governor of Connecticut in 2010 as a Republican but failed to receive enough support from delegates to qualify for the primary ballot.

DeNardis died after a brief hospitalization in New Haven on August 24, 2018 at the age of 80.

Personal life
His daughter is Leslie DeNardis.

References

External links

|-

|-

1938 births
2018 deaths
Politicians from New Haven, Connecticut
Military personnel from New Haven, Connecticut
College of the Holy Cross alumni
New York University alumni
University of New Haven people
Republican Party Connecticut state senators
Heads of universities and colleges in the United States
United States Department of Health and Human Services officials
Republican Party members of the United States House of Representatives from Connecticut
Albertus Magnus College faculty